Go with Peace, Jamil is a 2008 Danish action film directed by Omar Shargawi.

References

External links 

2008 action films
2008 films
Danish action films